<noinclude>

The All India Trinamool Congress (AITC) is an Indian national political party with great influence in the state of West Bengal. It is a congress party founded by the former Minister of Railways of the Republic of India Mamata Banerjee (Didi) on 1 January 1998 as a breakaway faction from the Indian National Congress. The party has won a three-time majority in the West Bengal Legislative Assembly and has been the ruling party in West Bengal since 20 May 2011. AITC is led by Mamata Banerjee as the chairperson of the party.

The headquarters of the party is located at Harish Chatterjee Street, Kolkata.

History

Founding 
After being a member of the Indian National Congress (INC) for over 26 years, Mamata Banerjee quit the INC and established the TMC in 1998. The official election symbol of the TMC is Jora Ghas Phul (two flowers with grass). In the 1998 Lok Sabha polls, TMC won 7 seats. In the next Lok Sabha election that was held in 1999, Trinamool Congress won 8 seats with BJP, thus increasing its tally by one. In 2000, TMC won the Kolkata Municipal Corporation Elections.

The party initially joined the National Democratic Alliance (NDA), as part of the Vajpayee government, and were initially quite successful, winning 7 seats in its first election in 1998. In the 2001 Vidhan Sabha elections, the TMC won 60 seats in alliance with the INC, becoming the principal opposition party. They suffered big losses in the 2004 Lok Sabha elections and the 2006 West Bengal Legislative Assembly election, and subsequently left the NDA.

Nandigram movement 

In December 2006, the people of Nandigram were given notice by Haldia Development Authority that a major portion of Nandigram would be seized and 70,000 people be evicted from their homes to make way for a chemical plant. People started movement against this land acquisition and the TMC helped lead the movement. The Bhumi Uchchhed Pratirodh Committee ('Committee against Land Evictions'; BUPC) was formed to protest against the eviction. On 14 March 2007 the police opened fire and killed 14 villagers and many more went missing. Many sources claimed (and which was supported by the Central Bureau of Investigation in its report) that armed Communist Party of India (Marxist) cadres, along with police, fired on protesters in Nandigram Many intellectuals protested in the streets and this incident gave birth to a new movement. Socialist Unity Centre of India (Communist) leader Nanda Patra led the movement. The events led to a significant backlash against the CPI(M) government, and were a major factor in the TMC's success in the elections that followed.

Post-Nandigram/Singur elections 

In the 2009 Lok Sabha election, TMC won 19 seats in West Bengal, in alliance with the Congress. They subsequently became a part of Manmohan Singh's government, with Banerjee serving as Minister of Railways.

In the 2010 Kolkata municipal election, the party won 97 out of 141 seats. It also won a majority of other municipalities.

In government 

In the 2011 West Bengal Legislative Assembly election, the TMC-led alliance that included the INC and SUCI(C) won 227 seats in the 294-seat legislature, defeating the incumbent Left Front government which had been in power for 34 years. TMC alone won 184 seats, enabling it to govern without an alliance. Subsequently, it won a by-election in Basirhat and two Congress MLAs switched to the TMC, giving it a total of 187 seats. Banerjee, an MP at the time, had not contested the election and had to transfer to the safe seat of Bhabanipur.

On 18 September 2012 Banerjee announced her decision to withdraw support to the UPA after the TMC's demands to undo government-instituted changes including FDI in retail, increase in the price of diesel and limiting the number of subsidised cooking gas cylinders for households, were not met.

The 2014 Lok Sabha elections saw the TMC dominate the state, winning 34 out of the 42 seats. It also qualified for national party status, as the TMC had received 6% of the vote from five different states (West Bengal, Manipur, Tripura, Jharkhand and Assam). On 2 September 2016 the Election Commission recognized TMC as a national political party.

The party was reelected in the 2016 election to a supermajority government, and Banerjee continued as chief minister.

The party won the most seats in West Bengal in the 2019 Indian general election, but suffered significant losses to the Bharatiya Janata Party, which for the first time established itself as a major force in the state. After the election, the party's status came under revision by the Election Commission of India, due to a loss in presence in most states outside West Bengal.

Banerjee's government was reelected again in the 2021 state election by an unexpectedly large margin over the BJP. Prior to the election, several high-profile TMC members such as Mukul Roy and Suvendu Adhikari had defected to the BJP. Despite the large winning margin, Banerjee was defeated by Adhikari in the Nandigram seat, where she had transferred to fight Adhikari head-on.

Presence in other states

Arunachal Pradesh 
In the 2009 Arunachal Pradesh Legislative Assembly election, Trinamool Congress won 5 seats and got 15.04% of the total votes. 

In 2020, an independent MLA Chakat Aboh joined the TMC.

Assam 
In the 2001 Assam Legislative Assembly election, Jamal Uddin Ahmed won Badarpur constituency. He was a Trinamool Congress candidate. Since then, the party has not emphasized on any other organization. Later in 2018, the work of the organization started again under the leadership of Dr. M. Shanti Kumar Singha. In the 2021 assembly elections, it was decided to field candidates from 14 constituencies on behalf of the party.

All-India president of Congress's women's wing and its national spokesperson and former Silchar MP Sushmita Dev joined the Trinamool Congress in August 2021. She is now an MP of Rajya Sabha.

Bihar 
On 23 November 2021 Kirti Azad, a 3-time MP from Darbhanga and Pavan Varma, a former adviser to Bihar CM Nitish Kumar, joined TMC.

Goa 
With the 2022 Goa Legislative Assembly election approaching, the work of organizing the party started from September 2021. The work began with the participation of seven-time Goa Chief Minister Luizinho Faleiro. Since then, the party has increased its membership in Goa. Former footballer Denzil Franco and former tennis player Leander Paes were among those who joined the party. On 13 November 2021, Mahua Moitra was appointed as the in-charge of the party in Goa to prepare it to contest in the Assembly election. MLA Churchill Alemao joined TMC on 13 December.

Haryana 
On 23 November 2021 Ashok Tanwar, former president of Haryana Pradesh Congress Committee, joined TMC. Sukhendu Shekhar Roy was appointed as in-charge of the party's Haryana unit on 25 November.

Kerala 
Kerala Pradesh Trinamool Congress was launched in 2009. In 2014 its candidates contested 5 seats under the party symbol in the parliamentary election. Leaders like Mukul Roy, Derek O'Brien, Mahua Moitra and Nadimul Haque visited Kerala and gave directions for further development in the party's activities. In the 2016 state election TMC contested in 70 assembly constituencies but due to technical errors, the party symbol was not accepted. On 3 August 2021 a 51-member state committee was formed and hoardings with caption "Call Didi Save India" were spread in parts of the state. Following leaders were elected in the committee – Manoj Sankaranellur (State President), Shamsu Payaningal (Working President), Shubash Kundannur (General Secretary), Harish Palathingal (State Secretary, Media & IT).

Manipur 
In the 2012 assembly elections of Manipur, the party won 8 seats and got 10% of the total votes. It became the only opposition party in the Manipur Legislative Assembly. In the 2017 assembly elections the party won only one seat (from Thanga) and received 5.4% of the total votes cast in the elections. Its lone member of the Manipur Legislative Assembly, Tongbram Robindro Singh, switched to the BJP government in Manipur in 2017. As of 18 June 2020, he has withdrawn support from the BJP, following the disqualification of 7 of its members, to support the Indian National Congress.

Meghalaya 
TMC candidate Purno Agitok Sangma won the Tura constituency by a huge margin in the 2004 Lok Sabha election.

The party's Meghalaya unit was launched in 2021.

On 24 November 2021 former Chief Minister of Meghalaya Mukul Sangma along with other 11 MLAs of INC joined TMC which made TMC the largest opposition party in Meghalaya Legislative Assembly.

On 29 November Charles Pyngrope was appointed as the president of AITC Meghalaya unit.
In 2022, one defected MLA who has earlier switched from INC quit the party and joined BJP.

Punjab 
Shortly before the Assembly elections in 2017, the party started working on the Punjab organization under the leadership of Jagat Singh. After that, during the assembly elections, it was decided that they would field candidates for 20 constituencies on behalf of the party. The party, however, did not gain any seats in Punjab in that election. After that the party's organisational work in Punjab almost completely stopped. From 2019, the party started a new committee under the leadership of Manjit Singh. Since then, the party has had a continuous presence in Punjab.

Tamil Nadu 
In 2014, a state unit for the party was formed in Tamil Nadu which was headed by Dr. Sabitha, who was responsible as the state convener and was appointed by the then-National-General-Secretary Mukul Roy. In 2017 Mr. Saravanan  had been appointed as the state general secretary. He formed the state committee to represent the party in Tamil Nadu. Since then, the party has been active in all social and political events.

Tripura 
Under the leadership of Sudip Roy Barman, former leader of opposition and then MLA of Tripura, all six MLAs of the Indian National Congress defected to the TMC in 2016, along with many ex-ministers, former MLAs, senior state and district level leaders, in addition to thousands of party workers and supporters, to fight CPI(M), who were running the Government in Tripura. Later in the presence of Himanta Biswa Sarma and Dharmendra Pradhan, Barman defected to the BJP along with all of the other TMC MLAs of the Tripura Legislative Assembly after they cross-voted against party lines in the 2017 Indian presidential election.

TMC won one seat in Ambassa Municipal council in the 2021 Tripura civic polls despite widespread violence. TMC emerged as the second largest party in terms of vote-share in the 120 seats it contested out of 334 seats as it garnered 19.9% of the votes in those seats.

Uttar Pradesh 
The party's state unit in Uttar Pradesh was set up in 2005.

In 2012, Shyam Sunder Sharma contested the by-poll to Mant constituency and won on a TMC ticket. He later defected to BSP.

Neeraj Rai is the current president of TMC's state unit in Uttar Pradesh.

In October 2021, two senior Congress leaders of Uttar Pradesh – Rajeshpati Tripathi and Laliteshpati Tripathi, who are the grandson and the great-grandson of former UP Chief Minister Kamalapati Tripathi, joined the TMC in the presence of Mamata Banerjee.

Electoral performance

General election results

State Legislative Assembly elections

Party symbols and slogans 

The party name and election symbol represents 'grassroots'– the name contains the Bengali word trinamool, which literally means grassroots, and the symbol is a sapling emerging from the ground. The symbol is known as Jora Ghas Phul (Bengali: grass and flower; two flowers with grass). The usage of "All India" in the party name represents the rejection of "elitist" Indian National Congress from which it broke apart from.

Ma Mati Manush was primarily a slogan, coined by Mamata Banerjee. The term is literally translated as "Mother, Motherland and People". The slogan became very popular in West Bengal at the time of the 2011 assembly election. Mamata Banerjee wrote a Bengali book with the same title. A song was also recorded with the same title.

In the 2021 assembly election, the party used a song "Khela Hobe" across the state. The song was penned by Debangshu Bhattacharya, a party youth wing member. The "Khela Hobe" term has been used across India by several opposition parties and to catalyze the movements against the establishment on multiple issues throughout the nation.

Leadership 
The highest decision-making body of the party is its Core Committee.
 Mamata Banerjee — Founder, National Chairperson, Leader of the party in the West Bengal Legislative Assembly and Chief Minister of West Bengal.
 Luizinho Faleiro  — National Vice President
 Abhishek Banerjee — National General Secretary 
 Derek O'Brien — National Spokesperson and Leader of the party in the Rajya Sabha.
 Sudip Bandyopadhyay — Leader of the party in the Lok Sabha.
 Kakoli Ghosh Dastidar — Deputy leader of the party in the Lok Sabha.
 Kalyan Banerjee — Chief Whip of the party in the Lok Sabha.
 Sukhendu Shekhar Roy — Chief Whip of TMC in Rajya Sabha. State Unit In-Charge, Haryana.
 Subrata Bakshi — President of the state unit of West Bengal. MP, Rajya Sabha.
 Sushmita Dev — State Unit In Charge,Assam. MP, Rajya Sabha.
 Mukul Sangma — Ex Leader of the Opposition in Meghalaya Legislative Assembly.
 Aroop Biswas  — Cashier

See also 

 Indian National Congress breakaway parties
 Nationalist Trinamool Youth Congress
 List of political parties in India

References

Further reading

External links 
 
 

 
1998 establishments in West Bengal
Political parties established in 1998
National political parties in India
Anti-communist parties 
Anti-communism in India
Anti-communist organizations
Progressive parties 
Populist parties 
Social democratic parties 
Social liberal parties 
Centre-left parties in Asia
Indian National Congress breakaway groups